Reenat Fauzia (born 1967) is a Bangladeshi sitarist.

Early life and family 

Fauzia was born in 1967. She is the daughter of Mobarak Hossain Khan, a former Director General of Bangladesh Shilpakala Academy and the chairman of the Trustee Board of Nazrul Institute, and Fauzia Khan, a vocal artist. She is the granddaughter of Ustaad Ayet Ali Khan.

Training 

Fauzia started her training in music lessons from her cousin Ustaad Shahadat Hossain Khan,  a sarode player of Bangladesh. Later, she received her Guru-Shishya-Parampara music training from her cousin Ustaad Khurshid Khan,  a sitar preceptor. She completed a five-year certificate course on sitar from Chhayanaut, a music institute of Bangladesh. Later she joined the faculty of the same institute as a teacher. After taking lessons on sitar for twelve years, she joined participating in programs of Bangladesh Television and Bangladesh Betar.  She also makes appearances on stage for performing solo recital on sitar 
During her visit to the US, UK, the Netherlands, Belgium, Germany, France, Philippines, and Hong Kong, she performed recitals on Sitar.

Awards 
 Anannya Top Ten Award (2009)

Discography 
 A Touch of Love
 Tribute to Grandfather Ustad Ayet Ali Khan
 Haramanik

References

External links 
 Creating passion through the Sitar The Daily Star, March 22, 2004
 Reenat Fauzia performing in 'Bengal Classical Music Fest, 2013'

1967 births
Living people
Sitar players
Laser Vision artists
Bengali musicians
21st-century Bangladeshi women singers
21st-century Bangladeshi singers